Kantakuzin or Kantakuzinović is the Serbian variant of the Byzantine surname Kantakouzenos; in the 15th century several descendants of the Kantakouzenoi lived in the Serbian Despotate. It may refer to:

Janja Kantakuzin
Dimitrije Kantakuzin

People of the Serbian Despotate
Serbian families
Medieval Serbian people of Greek descent